William, Willie, Bill or Billy Watson may refer to:

Entertainment
 William Watson (songwriter) (1794–1840), English concert hall singer and songwriter
 William Watson (poet) (1858–1935), English poet
 Billy Watson (actor) (1923–2022), American actor
 William Watson (writer) (1930–2005), also known as Bill Watson, Scottish writer
 William C. Watson (1938–1997), American actor
 Willie Watson (musician) (born 1979), American folk musician

Military
 William H. Watson (1815–1846), Mexican–American War soldier from Maryland, U.S.
 William Watson (sergeant) (1826–1906), in the Confederate States Army
 William Watson (surgeon) (1837–1879), in Pennsylvania Volunteers during the American Civil War
 William Thornton Watson (1887–1961), New Zealand officer in the Australian Imperial Force
 William E. Watson, military historian

Politics
 William Watson (16th century MP), MP for the City of York
 William Henry Watson (1796–1860), British politician and judge
 William Watson (New South Wales politician) (1815–1877), Australian politician
 William John Watson (1839–1886), Australian politician
 William T. Watson (1849–1917), American banker and governor of Delaware
 William W. Watson Sr., 19th century North Carolina politician
 William Watson (Australian politician) (1864–1938), Australian politician
 William McLean Watson (1874–1962), Scottish politician
 W. Marvin Watson (1924–2017), U.S. Postmaster General
 William Watson, mayor of Rockford, Illinois, U.S., 1878–79

Science
 William Watson (scientist) (1715–1787), English physician and scientist
 William Watson (physician) (1744–1824), English physician and naturalist
 William Watson (surveyor and scientist) (1784–1857), cartographer and sundial-maker from Seaton Ross
 William Livingstone Watson (1835–1903), Scottish East India merchant and astronomer
 Watson Cheyne or Sir William Watson (1852–1932), 1st Baronet Cheyne, Scottish surgeon and bacteriologist
 William Watson (botanist) (1858–1925), British botanist and horticulturalist
 William Watson (physicist) (1868–1919), British physicist
 William Watson (Scottish physicist) (1884–1952), FRSE Scottish physicist and mathematician
 William Weldon Watson (1899–1992), American nuclear physicist

Sports

Association football
 William Watson (Scottish footballer) (fl. 1898), Scottish footballer (Falkirk FC and Scotland)
 Billy Watson (footballer, born 1890) (1890–1955), English international footballer with Burnley, 1908–1925
 Billy Watson (footballer, born 1893) (1893–1962), English footballer with Huddersfield Town, 1912–1927
 William Watson (footballer) (fl. 1903–1909), Lincoln City footballer active in the 1900s
 Bill Watson (footballer, born 1899) (1899–1969), English footballer in the 1920s–30s
 Bill Watson (footballer, born 1916) (1916-1986), English footballer, fullback for Lincoln City, Chesterfield and Rochdale
 William Watson (footballer, born 1900) (1900–?), Scottish footballer (Dumbarton FC)
 Willie Watson (footballer, born 1910), Scottish footballer (Hibernian, Ayr United)
 Jimmy Watson (footballer, born 1914) (1914–1979), aka Bill Watson (William James Boyd Watson), English footballer in the 1930s
 Billy Watson (soccer), Scottish-American footballer in the 1920s–30s
 Billy Watson (Scottish footballer) (died 1950), Bradford City A.F.C. footballer, 1921–1931
 Willie Watson (English cricketer) (1920–2004), English cricketer and footballer 
 Willie Watson (footballer, born 1949), Scottish footballer (Manchester United, Motherwell)
 Graham Watson (footballer, born 1949), English footballer, aka "Willie" Watson

Cricket
 William Watson (cricketer, born 1881) (1881–1926), Australian cricketer
 Willie Watson (English cricketer) (1920–2004), English cricketer and footballer
 Bill Watson (cricketer) (1931–2018), Australian cricketer
 Willie Watson (New Zealand cricketer) (born 1965), New Zealand cricketer

Rugby
 Billy Watson (rugby union) (1869–1953), member of the 1893 New Zealand rugby union team
 Bill Watson (rugby union), born 1949, Scotland international rugby union player
 Billy Watson (rugby league), rugby league footballer of the 1930s for England, and Keighley

Other sports
 William Watson (motoring pioneer) (1873–1961), British racing driver and motoring pioneer
 William Watson (weightlifter), British Olympic weightlifter
 Whipper Billy Watson (1915–1990), Canadian wrestler
 William Watson (decathlete) (1916–1973), aka "Big Bill" Watson, American track and field athlete
 William Watson (basketball) (fl. 1920s), African-American basketball player
 Bill Watson (baseball), American baseball player
 Bill Watson (ice hockey) (born 1964), ice hockey player in Minnesota
 Willie Watson (bowls), Irish international lawn bowler
 William Poss Watson (1868–1950), Australian rules footballer
 Willie Watson (American Football Player) Bowling Green State University OL/DL 1994-1999, Chicago Rush Arena Football 2003, NFL 2003

Other people
 William Watson (bow maker) (1930–?), British bow maker
 William Watson (chess player) (born 1962), English chess grandmaster
 William Watson (economist), Canadian economist, member of the research advisory board for Macdonald–Laurier Institute
 William Watson (merchant) (died 20 November 1559), English merchant and shipowner 
 William Watson (priest) (1559–1603), English Roman Catholic priest and conspirator
 William Watson (sinologist) (1917–2007), professor of Chinese art and archaeology at London University
 William Watson, Baron Watson (1827–1899), Scottish judge
 William Watson, Baron Thankerton (1873–1948), Scottish judge
 William J. Watson (1865–1948), Scottish teacher and scholar of place names
 William R. Watson (1887–1973), Canadian art dealer